FMN reductase (NAD(P)H) (FRG) is an enzyme with systematic name FMNH2:NAD(P)+ oxidoreductase. This enzyme catalyses the following chemical reaction

 FMNH2 + NAD(P)+  FMN + NAD(P)H + H+

This enzyme contains FMN.

References

External links 
 

EC 1.5.1